The Irish League in season 1912–13 comprised 10 teams, and Glentoran won the championship.

League standings

Results

References
Northern Ireland - List of final tables (RSSSF)

1912-13
1912–13 in European association football leagues
Irish